Playa is a Cuban municipality, located in the Havana province. It covers an area of 36.8 square kilometers, which makes up 8.95% of the provincial extension.

Geography
Playa is the most northwestern of the municipios. It stretches from the Almendares River in the east, to Santa Fe in the west. 

It includes the upmarket district of Miramar and the former fishing village of Jaimanitas. Other districts include Flores, Náutico, Siboney, Kohly and Buenavista. Many societies and venues have been located in the area, including the Buena Vista Social Club.

Points of interest

Education
Post-secondary institutions include:
 ELAM (Latin American School of Medicine) in Santa Fe

Primary and secondary schools include:
 International School of Havana in Miramar
 Centro Educativo Español de La Habana in Miramar
 École Française de la Havane (French international school) in Siboney

See also

Ciudad Libertad Airport
Puentes Grandes

References

External links

Cubasi - Details of municipality (Spanish)

Municipalities of Havana